Jazz Impressions of A Boy Named Charlie Brown (stylized with quotation marks as Jazz Impressions of "A Boy Named Charlie Brown") is the sixth studio album by American jazz pianist Vince Guaraldi (credited to the Vince Guaraldi Trio), released in the U.S. by Fantasy Records in December 1964. It is the soundtrack to the unreleased television documentary film entitled A Boy Named Charlie Brown.

Production
Vince Guaraldi was contacted by television producer Lee Mendelson to compose music for a documentary on the comic strip Peanuts and its creator, Charles M. Schulz. Although the special went unaired due to Mendelson's failure to secure a sponsor, Guaraldi's selections were released in 1964 as Jazz Impressions of A Boy Named Charlie Brown. Most of the tracks were designed to introduce and accompany specific characters. Although never aired on television, the 30-minute documentary was instrumental in garnering commercial support and the creative teamwork that resulted in A Charlie Brown Christmas in 1965 and Guaraldi's accompanying soundtrack, which has been a perennial holiday favorite.

The album is famous for including the recording of the Peanuts instrumental tune, "Linus and Lucy". The version included on the album would be re-released on future Guaraldi albums over the next half-century, most notably on A Charlie Brown Christmas. Bassist Monty Budwig and drummer Colin Bailey were credited as performing on the album.

Cover artwork and packaging
The original cover of the album consisted of an elaborate gatefold album jacket with a picture of Guaraldi's head pasted over a cartoon image of his body. Guaraldi is seen stealing Lucy's affections from Schroeder while seated at his toy piano, with Linus and Charlie Brown playing double bass and guitar, respectively, and Snoopy dancing alongside of them. The rear cover featured 12 individual Schulz drawings of Peanuts characters, with each drawing reproduced in a larger 8-by-10 format, as frame-ready posters that were stored inside the gatefold.

For the 1972 re-release, the cover art was changed to the 8-by-10 drawing of Charlie Brown seen on his pitcher's mound wearing his yellow striped shirt and baseball cap originally used as one of the frame-ready posters. The title was also shortened to simply A Boy Named Charlie Brown, with the subtitle The Original Sound Track Recording of the CBS Television Special.

Release
Jazz Impressions of A Boy Named Charlie Brown was released on CD in 1989 under the title A Boy Named Charlie Brown and featured a live bonus track of "Fly Me to the Moon". Fantasy Records also inserted a new cover image featuring Charlie Brown in a red shirt and baseball cap and rolling his eyes. The 2014 remaster was retitled A Boy Named Charlie Brown (The Original Sound Track Recording) (deleting the mention of the CBS Television Special) and contained an alternate take of "Baseball Theme." The cover art also reverted to the 1972 reissue printing release featuring Charlie Brown in his classic yellow striped shirt.

Critical reception
Upon its initial release, Jazz Impressions of A Boy Named Charlie Brown was a hit and has remained so well into the 21st century.

In the album's liner notes, music critic and Rolling Stone founding editor Ralph J. Gleason praised Guaraldi, noting, "The hardest task an artist faces is not just to achieve self-expression; that almost comes by definition, even if it's difficult to hone that self-expression into something good enough to be art." Gleason continued: "It is another kind of thing altogether to look at, hear, feel and experience somebody else's artistic expression and then make something of your own which shows empathy, which relates to the other but which still has your own individual artistic stamp. That is what Vince Guaraldi achieved with his scores for Charlie Brown. He took his inspiration from the creations of Charles Schulz and made music that reflects that inspiration, is empathetic with the image and is still solidly and unmistakably Vince Guaraldi."

Among contemporary reviews, AllMusic critic Richard S. Ginell noted that "the music heard here probably introduced millions of kids (and their parents) to jazz from the mid-'60s onward." He added "the most remarkable thing, besides the high quality of Guaraldi's whimsically swinging tunes, is that he did not compromise his art one iota for the cartoon world; indeed, he sounds even more engaged, inventive, and lighthearted in his piano work here than ever. It must have been quite a delightful shock back then to hear a straight-ahead jazz trio backing all those cartoon figures and genuine children's voices, a mordant running musical commentary that made its own philosophical points."

Derrick Bang, Guaraldi historian and author of Vince Guaraldi at the Piano, commented that, "the importance of this album and its successor, the score to the Christmas special, cannot be overstated; rarely has an entertainment icon been so quickly — and firmly — welded to a musical composition...indeed, to an entire body of work from one individual. Guaraldi defined the Peanuts sound, and it's just as true today as it was in the 1960s. The compositions themselves are uniformly sparkling; it's as if the jazz pianist and his trio were waiting for this precise inspiration." Bang also noted that the album "represents one of the very few times a soundtrack was issued for a program that people never saw."

Chart performance
The album peaked at number 20 on the Billboard Soundtracks chart on the week ending March 13, 2015.

Track listing

Original 1964 vinyl issue

1989 CD release

2014 CD remaster

Notes
  copyright registration for song is "Happiness Theme", not "Happiness Is"
  original 1964 release misspells "Frieda" as "Freda"

Personnel 
Credits adapted from the original vinyl release.

Vince Guaraldi Trio
Vince Guaraldi – piano
Monty Budwig – double bass
Colin Bailey – drums

Production
Lee Mendelson – liner notes
Ralph J. Gleason – liner notes
Charles M. Schulz – artwork

References

External links 
 

1964 soundtrack albums
Albums arranged by Vince Guaraldi
Vince Guaraldi albums
Vince Guaraldi soundtracks
Cool jazz soundtracks
Mainstream jazz soundtracks
Fantasy Records soundtracks
Peanuts music
Television animation soundtracks